Balneario de Rincón is a public beach in Rincón, Puerto Rico.   It hosted the Triathlon events for the 2010 Central American and Caribbean Games.

References

External links

Beaches of Puerto Rico
2010 Central American and Caribbean Games venues
Rincón, Puerto Rico